Conehead or cone head may refer to:

Animals
 Conocephalinae, a subfamily of insects, especially:
 Conocephalus, a genus of insects
 Neoconocephalus, a genus of insects
 Ruspolia, a genus of insects
 Protura, an order of soil-dwelling arthropods
 Conehead mantis, Empusa pennata
 Conehead eel, Cynoponticus coniceps

Film and TV
 Coneheads, a Saturday Night Live sketch comedy series
 Coneheads (film), a 1993 film based on the SNL sketch